Private Eye is a British fortnightly satirical and current affairs news magazine, founded in 1961. It is published in London and has been edited by Ian Hislop since 1986. The publication is widely recognised for its prominent criticism and lampooning of public figures. It is also known for its in-depth investigative journalism into under-reported scandals and cover-ups.

Private Eye is Britain's best-selling current affairs magazine, and such is its long-term popularity and impact that many of its recurring in-jokes have entered popular culture in the United Kingdom. The magazine bucks the trend of declining circulation for print media, having recorded its highest ever circulation in the second half of 2016. It is privately owned and highly profitable.

With a "deeply conservative resistance to change", it has resisted moves to online content or glossy format: it has always been printed on cheap paper and resembles, in format and content, a comic as much as a serious magazine. Both its satire and investigative journalism have led to numerous libel suits. It is well known for the use of pseudonyms by its contributors, many of whom have been prominent in public life – this even extends to a fictional proprietor, Lord Gnome.

History
The forerunner of Private Eye was The Salopian, a school magazine published at Shrewsbury School in the mid-1950s and edited by Richard Ingrams, Willie Rushton, Christopher Booker and Paul Foot. After National Service, Ingrams and Foot went as undergraduates to Oxford University, where they met future collaborators including Peter Usborne, Andrew Osmond and John Wells.

The magazine proper began when they learned of a new printing process, photo-litho offset, which meant that anybody with a typewriter and Letraset could produce a magazine. The publication was initially funded by Osmond and launched in 1961. It is generally agreed that Osmond suggested the title, and sold many of the early copies in person, in London pubs.

The magazine was initially edited by Booker and designed by Rushton, who drew cartoons for it. Its subsequent editor, Ingrams, who was then pursuing a career as an actor, shared the editorship with Booker, from around issue number 10, and took over from issue 40. At first, Private Eye was a vehicle for juvenile jokes: an extension of the original school magazine, and an alternative to Punch.

Peter Cook – who in October 1961 founded The Establishment, the first satirical nightclub in London – purchased Private Eye in 1962, together with Nicholas Luard,
 and was a long-time contributor.

Others essential to the development of the magazine were Auberon Waugh, Claud Cockburn (who had run a pre-war scandal sheet, The Week), Barry Fantoni, Gerald Scarfe, Tony Rushton, Patrick Marnham and Candida Betjeman. Christopher Logue was another long-time contributor, providing the column "True Stories", featuring cuttings from the national press. The gossip columnist Nigel Dempster wrote extensively for the magazine before he fell out with Ian Hislop and other writers, while Foot wrote on politics, local government and corruption.

Ingrams continued as editor until 1986, when he was succeeded by Hislop. Ingrams remains chairman of the holding company.

Style of the magazine

Private Eye often reports on the misdeeds of powerful and important individuals and, consequently, has received numerous libel writs throughout its history. These include three issued by James Goldsmith (known in the magazine as "(Sir) Jammy Fishpaste" and "Jonah Jammy fingers") and several by Robert Maxwell (known as "Captain Bob"), one of which resulted in the award of costs and reported damages of £225,000, and attacks on the magazine by Maxwell through a book, Malice in Wonderland, and a one-off magazine, Not Private Eye. Its defenders point out that it often carries news that the mainstream press will not print for fear of legal reprisals or because the material is of minority interest.

As well as covering a wide range of current affairs, Private Eye is also known for highlighting the errors and hypocritical behaviour of newspapers in the "Street of Shame" column, named after Fleet Street, the former home of many papers. It reports on parliamentary and national political issues, with regional and local politics covered in equal depth under the "Rotten Boroughs" column. Extensive investigative journalism is published under the "In the Back" section, often tackling cover-ups and unreported scandals. A financial column called "In the City", written by Michael Gillard under the pseudonym "Slicker", has generated a wide business readership as a number of significant financial scandals and unethical business practices and personalities have been exposed there.

Some contributors to Private Eye are media figures or specialists in their field who write anonymously, often under humorous pseudonyms, such as "Dr B Ching" who writes the "Signal Failures" column about the railways, in reference to the Beeching cuts. Stories sometimes originate from writers from more mainstream publications who cannot get their stories published by their main employers.

Private Eye has traditionally lagged behind other magazines in adopting new typesetting and printing technologies. At the start it was laid out with scissors and paste and typed on three IBM Electric typewriters – italics, pica and elite – lending an amateurish look to the pages. For some years after layout tools became available the magazine retained this technique to maintain its look, although the three older typewriters were replaced with an IBM composer. Today the magazine is still predominantly in black and white (though the cover and some cartoons inside appear in colour) and there is more text and less white space than is typical for a modern magazine. Much of the text is printed in the standard Times New Roman font. The former "Colour Section" was printed in black and white like the rest of the magazine: only the content was colourful.

Frequent targets for parody and satire

While the magazine in general reports corruption, self-interest and incompetence in a broad range of industries and lines of work, certain people and entities have received a greater amount of attention and coverage in its pages. As the most visible public figures, prime ministers and senior politicians make the most natural targets, but Private Eye also aims its criticism at journalists, newspapers and prominent or interesting businesspeople. It is the habit of the magazine to attach nicknames, usually offensive or crude, to these people, and often to create surreal and extensive alternate personifications of them, which usually take the form of parody newspaper articles in the second half of the magazine.

Frequent and notable investigations

Private Eye has regularly and extensively reported on and investigated a wide range of far-reaching issues, including:

 The utilisation of tax havens by large corporations and the failure of government in tackling the problem.
 The revolving door from politics to lucrative corporate roles.
 The MPs' expenses scandal and ongoing abuses of the expenses system.
 Conflicts of interest in general, but particularly between public officials or politicians and big business, the arms trade, etc.
 Human rights abuses by countries with whom the government continues to carry on business.
 Phone hacking and other improper practices in the mainstream press.
 The deaths at Deepcut army barracks between 1995 and 2002, particularly that of Cheryl James in 1995.
 The investigation into the Lockerbie bombing of 1988.
 The contaminated blood scandal of the 1970s and 1980s.
 The Post Office computer scandal, where the Post Office's faulty Horizon computer system led to many innocent postmasters and postmistresses being falsely imprisoned for alleged fraud. The accused were finally absolved in 2021.

Notable columns
A series of parody columns referring to the Prime Minister of the day has been a long-term feature of Private Eye. While generally satirical, during the 1980s, Ingrams and John Wells wrote an affectionate series of fictional letters from Denis Thatcher to Bill Deedes in the Dear Bill column, mocking Thatcher as an amiable, golf-playing drunk. The column was collected in a series of books and became a stage-play ("Anyone For Denis?") in which Wells played the fictional Denis, a character now inextricably "blurred [with] the real historical figure", according to Ingrams.

In The Back is an investigative journalism section notably associated with journalist Paul Foot (the Eye has always published its investigative journalism at the back of the magazine). Private Eye was one of the journalistic organisations involved in sifting and analysing the Paradise Papers, and this commentary appears in In the Back.

Nooks and Corners (originally Nooks and Corners of the New Barbarism), an architectural column severely critical of architectural vandalism and "barbarism", notably modernism and brutalism, was originally founded by John Betjeman in 1971 (his first article attacked a building praised by his enemy Nikolaus Pevsner) and carried on by his daughter Candida Lycett Green. For four decades beginning in 1978 it was edited by Gavin Stamp under the pseudonym Piloti. The column notably features discussion of the state of public architecture and especially the preservation (or otherwise) of Britain's architectural heritage.

Street of Shame is a column addressing journalistic misconduct and excesses, hypocrisy, and undue influence by proprietors and editors, mostly sourced from tipoffs – it sometimes serves as a venue for the settling of scores within the trade, and is a source of friction with editors. This work formed the basis of much of Ian Hislop's testimony to the Leveson Inquiry, and Leveson was complimentary about the magazine and the column. The term street of shame is a reference to Fleet Street, the former centre of British journalism, and has become synonymous with it.

The Rotten Boroughs column focusses on actual or alleged wrong-doing in local or regional governments and elections, for example corruption, nepotism, hypocrisy and incompetence.  The column's name derives from the 18th-century rotten boroughs.

There are also several recurring miniature sections.

Special editions
The magazine has occasionally published special editions dedicated to the reporting of particular events, such as government inadequacy over the 2001 foot and mouth outbreak, the conviction in 2001 of Abdelbaset al-Megrahi for the 1988 Lockerbie bombing (an incident regularly covered since by "In the Back"), and the purported MMR vaccine controversy (since shown to be medical fraud committed by Andrew Wakefield) in 2002.

A special issue was published in 2004 to mark the death of long-time contributor Paul Foot. In 2005, The Guardian and Private Eye established the Paul Foot Award (referred to colloquially as the "Footy"), with an annual £10,000 prize fund, for investigative/campaigning journalism in memory of Foot.

In-jokes

The magazine has a number of recurring in-jokes and convoluted references, often comprehensible only to those who have read the magazine for many years. They include euphemisms designed to avoid the notoriously plaintiff-friendly English libel laws, such as replacing the word "drunk" with "tired and emotional", or using the phrase "Ugandan discussions" to denote illicit sexual exploits; and more obvious parodies utilising easily recognisable stereotypes, such as the lampooning of Conservative MPs as "Sir Bufton Tufton". Some of the terms have fallen into disuse when their hidden meanings have become better-known.

The magazine often deliberately misspells the names of certain organisations, such as "Crapita" for the outsourcing company Capita, "Carter-Fuck" for the law firm Carter-Ruck, and "The Grauniad" for The Guardian (the latter a reference to the newspaper's frequent typos in its days as The Manchester Guardian).  Certain individuals may be referred to by another name, for example Piers Morgan as "Piers Moron", Richard Branson as "Beardie", Rupert Murdoch as the "Dirty Digger", and Queen Elizabeth II and King Charles III as "Brenda" and "Brian" respectively.

The first half of each issue, which consists chiefly of news reporting and investigative journalism, tends to include these in-jokes in a more subtle manner, so as to maintain journalistic integrity, while the second half, generally characterised by unrestrained parody and cutting humour, tends to present itself in a more confrontational way.

Cartoons
As well as many one-off cartoons, Private Eye features a number of regular comic strips:
 Apparently by Mike Barfield – satirising day-to-day life or pop trends.
 Celeb by Charles Peattie and Mark Warren, collectively known as Ligger – a strip about a celebrity rock star named Gary Bloke, which first appeared in 1987. A BBC sitcom version was spun-off in 2002.
 Desperate Business by Modern Toss – stereotypes a range of professions, such as an estate agent showing a couple a minuscule house, with the caption: "It's a bit smaller than it looked on your website".
 EUphemisms by RGJ – features a European Union bureaucrat making a statement, with a caption suggesting what it means in real terms, generally depicting the EU in a negative or hypocritical light. For example, an EU official declares: "Punishing Britain for Brexit would show the world we've lost the plot", with the caption reading: "We're going to punish Britain for Brexit. We've lost the plot".
 Fallen Angels – a regular cartoon with a caption depicting problems (often bureaucratic) in the National Health Service.
 First Drafts by Simon Pearsell – original drafts of popular books.
 Forgotten Moments in Music History – features cryptic references to notable songs and performers.
 It's Grim Up North London by Knife and Packer – satire about Islington "trendies" which has featured since 1999.
 Logos as they Should Be – satire of logos from some of the world's most-known companies.
 The Premiersh*ts by Paul Wood – satire of professional football and footballers, in particular in the Premier League.
 Snipcock & Tweed by Nick Newman – about two book publishers.
 Supermodels by Neil Kerber – satirising the lifestyle of supermodels; the characters are unfeasibly thin.
 Yobs and Yobettes by Tony Husband – satirising yob culture, featuring since the late-1980s.
 Young British Artists by Birch – a spoof of the Young British Artists movement such as Tracey Emin and Damien Hirst.

Some of the magazine's former cartoon strips include:
 The Adventures of Mr Millibean – former Leader of the Opposition, Ed Miliband, is portrayed as Rowan Atkinson's Mr. Bean.
 Andy Capp-in-Ring – a parody of Andy Capp, satirising Labour leadership candidate Andy Burnham and his rivals, portraying Burnham as Capp.
 Barry McKenzie – a popular strip in the mid-1960s detailing the adventures of an expatriate Australian in Earl's Court, London and elsewhere, written by Barry Humphries and drawn by Nicholas Garland.
 Battle for Britain – a satire of British politics (1983–87) in terms of a World War II war comic.
 The Broon-ites – a pastiche of Scottish cartoon strip The Broons, featuring Gordon Brown and his close associates. The speech bubbles are written in broad Scots.
 Dan Dire, Pilot of the Future? and Tony Blair, Pilot for the Foreseeable Future – parodies of the Dan Dare comics of the 1950s, satirising (respectively) Neil Kinnock's time as Labour leader, and Tony Blair's Labour government.
 Dave Snooty and his New Pals – drawn in the style of The Beano, it parodied David Cameron as "Dave Snooty" (a reference to the Beano character "Lord Snooty"), involved in public schoolboy-type behaviour with members of his cabinet. Cameron is portrayed as wearing an Eton College uniform with bow tie, tailcoat, waistcoat and pinstriped trousers.
 The Directors by Dredge & Rigg – commented on the excesses of boardroom fat cats.
 The Cloggies by Bill Tidy – about clog dancers.
 The Commuters by Grizelda – followed the efforts of two commuters to get a train to work.
 Global Warming: The Plus Side – a satire of the effects of global warming, suggesting mock "positive" impacts of the phenomena, such as bus-sized marrows in village vegetable competitions, vastly decreased fossil prices due to melting permafrost, and the proliferation of British citrus orchards.
 Gogglebollox by Goddard – a satirical take on recent television shows.
 Great Bores of Today by Michael Heath.
 The Has-Beano – a pastiche of The Beano used to satirise The Spectator and Boris Johnson (who features as the lead character, Boris the Menace).
 Hom Sap by David Austin.
 Liz – a cartoon about the Royal Family drawn by Cutter Perkins and RGJ in the style of the comic magazine Viz (with speech in Geordie dialect). Ran from issue 801 to 833.
 Meet the Clintstones – The Prehistoric First Family – drawn in the style of The Flintstones, this was a parody of Bill and Hillary Clinton during his presidency and the 2008 U.S. presidential election.
 Off Your Trolley by Reeve & Way – set in an NHS hospital.
 The Regulars also by Michael Heath – based on the drinking scene at the Coach and Horses pub in London (a regular meeting place for the magazine's staff and guests), and featuring the catchphrase "Jeff bin in?" (a reference to pub regular, the journalist Jeffrey Bernard).
 Scenes You Seldom See by Barry Fantoni – satirising the habits of British people by portraying the opposite of what is the generally accepted norm.

At various times, Private Eye has also used the work of Ralph Steadman, Wally Fawkes, Timothy Birdsall, Martin Honeysett, Willie Rushton, Gerald Scarfe, Robert Thompson, Ken Pyne, Geoff Thompson, "Jorodo", Ed McLauchlan, Simon Pearsall, Kevin Woodcock, Brian Bagnall, Kathryn Lamb and George Adamson.

Other products

Private Eye has from time to time produced various spin-offs from the magazine, including:
 Books, e.g. annuals, cartoon collections and investigative pamphlets;
 Audio recordings;
 Private Eye TV, a 1971 BBC TV version of the magazine; and
 Memorabilia and commemorative products, such as Christmas cards.

Private Eye Extras
 Page 94, The Private Eye Podcast since Episode 1, 4 March 2015, named after the running joke continued on page 94, and hosted by Andrew Hunter Murray.
 Eyeplayer (see iPlayer) Videos and Audio since 2008. Flash, hosted MP3s, YouTube videos. Including phone related pieces, audio performances at the Lyttelton Theatre, and Private Eye: A Review Of : 2016, 2015, and 2014.
 Covers Library – Issue 1. 25 October 1961 to present.
 Councillors Map – interactive map of local councillors who have not paid their council tax.
 UK Tax Haven Map – searchable map of properties, in England and Wales, owned by offshore companies.
 The Eye At 50 Blog – February 2009 to September 2013.
 Cyril Smith – Archive of the original stories that ran in Private Eye 454 and in the Rochdale Alternative Press (RAP), in 1979, involving the establishment cover-up child abuse by the late Liberal MP Sir Cyril Smith. In May 2022, in an article titled "Cesspit News", Private Eye reminded readers that the late anti-gay "God's Cop" Sir James Anderton had turned a blind eye to the decades long abuse by Smith of boys in care.

Criticism and controversy

Princess Diana

Some have found the magazine's irreverence and sometimes controversial humour offensive. Following the death of Diana, Princess of Wales in 1997, Private Eye printed a cover headed "Media to blame". Under this headline was a picture of many hundreds of people outside Buckingham Palace, with one person commenting that the papers were "a disgrace", another agreeing, saying that it was impossible to get one anywhere, and another saying, "Borrow mine. It's got a picture of the car."

Following the abrupt change in reporting from newspapers immediately following her death, the issue also featured a mock retraction from "all newspapers" of everything negative that they had ever said about Diana. This was enough to cause a flood of complaints and the temporary removal of the magazine from the shelves of some newsagents. These included WHSmith, which had previously refused to stock Private Eye until well into the 1970s, and was characterised in the magazine as "WH Smugg" or "WH Smut" on account of its policy of stocking pornographic magazines.

Other complaints
The issues that followed the Ladbroke Grove rail crash in 1999 (number 987), the September 11 attacks of 2001 (number 1037; the magazine even including a special "subscription cancellation coupon" for disgruntled readers to send in) and the Soham murders of 2002 all attracted similar complaints. Following the 7/7 London bombings the magazine's cover (issue number 1137) featured Prime Minister Tony Blair saying to London mayor Ken Livingstone: "We must track down the evil mastermind behind the bombers...", to which Livingstone replies: "...and invite him around for tea", in reference to his controversial invitation of the Islamic theologian Yusuf al-Qaradawi to London.

MMR vaccine
During the early 2000s Private Eye published many stories on the MMR vaccine controversy, substantially supporting the interpretation by Andrew Wakefield of published research in The Lancet by the Royal Free Hospital's Inflammatory Bowel Disease Study Group, which described an apparent link between the vaccine and autism and bowel problems. Many of these stories accused medical researchers who supported the vaccine's safety of having conflicts of interest because of funding from the pharmaceutical industry.

Initially dismissive of Wakefield, the magazine rapidly moved to support him, in 2002 publishing a 32-page MMR Special Report that supported Wakefield's assertion that MMR vaccines "should be given individually at not less than one year intervals." The British Medical Journal issued a contemporary press release that concluded: "The Eye report is dangerous in that it is likely to be read by people who are concerned about the safety of the vaccine. A doubting parent who reads this might be convinced there is a genuine problem and the absence of any proper references will prevent them from checking the many misleading statements." Subsequently, editor Ian Hislop told the author and columnist Ben Goldacre that Private Eye is "not anti-MMR".

In a review article published in 2010, after Wakefield was disciplined by the General Medical Council, regular columnist Phil Hammond, who contributes to the "Medicine Balls" column under the pseudonym "MD", stated that: "Private Eye got it wrong in its coverage of MMR", in maintaining its support for Wakefield's position long after shortcomings in his work had emerged.

Accusations of hostility
Senior figures in the trade union movement have accused the publication of having a classist anti-union bias, with Unite chief of staff Andrew Murray describing Private Eye as "a publication of assiduous  public school boys" and adding that it has "never once written anything about trade unions that isn't informed by cynicism and hostility". The Socialist Worker also wrote that "For the past 50 years, the satirical magazine Private Eye has upset and enraged the powerful. Its mix of humour and investigation has tirelessly challenged the hypocrisy of the elite. ... But it also has serious weaknesses. Among the witty — if sometimes tired — spoof articles and cartoons, there is a nasty streak of snobbery and prejudice. Its jokes about the poor, women and young people rely on lazy stereotypes you might expect from the columns of the Daily Mail. It is the anti-establishment journal of the establishment."

Blasphemy
The 2004 Christmas issue received a number of complaints after it featured Pieter Bruegel's painting of a nativity scene, in which one wise man said to another: "Apparently, it's David Blunkett's" (who at the time was involved in a scandal in which he was thought to have impregnated a married woman). Many readers sent letters accusing the magazine of blasphemy and anti-Christian attitudes. One stated that the "witless, gutless buggers wouldn't dare mock Islam". It has, however, regularly published Islam-related humour such as the cartoon which portrayed a "Taliban careers master asking a pupil: What would you like to be when you blow up?".

Many letters in the first issue of 2005 disagreed with the former readers' complaints, and some were parodies of those letters, "complaining" about the following issue's cover – a cartoon depicting Santa's sleigh shredded by a wind farm: one said: "To use a picture of Our Lord Father Christmas and his Holy Reindeer being torn limb from limb while flying over a windfarm is inappropriate and blasphemous."

"Fake news"

In November 2016, Private Eye official website appeared on a controversial list of over 150 "fake news" websites compiled by Melissa Zimdars, a US lecturer. The site was listed as a source that is "purposefully fake with the intent of satire/comedy, which can offer important critical commentary on politics and society, but have the potential to be shared as actual/literal news." The Eye rejected any such classification, saying its site "contains none of these things, as the small selection of stories online are drawn from the journalism pages of the magazine", adding that "even US college students might recognise that the Headmistress's letter is not really from a troubled high school". Zimdars later removed the website from her list, after the Eye had contacted her for clarification.

Litigation
Private Eye has long been known for attracting libel lawsuits, which in English law can lead to the award of damages relatively easily. The publication maintains a large amount of money as a "fighting fund" (although the magazine frequently finds other ways to defuse legal tensions, for example by printing letters from aggrieved parties). As editor since 1986, Ian Hislop is reportedly one of the most sued people in Britain. From 1969 to the mid-1980s, the magazine was represented by human rights lawyer Geoffrey Bindman.

The first person to successfully sue Private Eye was the writer Colin Watson, who objected to the magazine's description of him as "the little-known author who ... was writing a novel, very Wodehouse but without the jokes". He was awarded £750.

For the tenth anniversary issue in 1971 (number 257), the cover showed a cartoon headstone inscribed with a long list of well-known names, and the epitaph: "They did not sue in vain".

In the case of Arkell v Pressdram (1971), the plaintiff was the subject of an article. Arkell's lawyers wrote a letter which concluded: "His attitude to damages will be governed by the nature of your reply." Private Eye responded: "We acknowledge your letter of 29th April referring to Mr J. Arkell. We note that Mr Arkell's attitude to damages will be governed by the nature of our reply and would therefore be grateful if you would inform us what his attitude to damages would be, were he to learn that the nature of our reply is as follows: fuck off." The plaintiff withdrew the threatened lawsuit.  In the years following, the magazine would refer to this exchange as a euphemism for a blunt and coarse dismissal, for example: "We refer you to the reply given in the case of Arkell v. Pressdram". As with "tired and emotional" this usage has spread beyond the magazine.

Another litigation case against the magazine was initiated in 1976 by James Goldsmith, who managed to arrange for criminal libel charges to be brought, meaning that, if found guilty, Richard Ingrams and the author of the article, Patrick Marnham could have been imprisoned. He sued over allegations that he had been one of the members of the Clermont Set who had conspired to assist Lord Lucan after Lucan had murdered his family nanny, Sandra Rivett. Goldsmith won a partial victory and eventually reached a settlement with the magazine. The case threatened to bankrupt Private Eye, which turned to its readers for financial support in the form of a "Goldenballs Fund". Goldsmith himself was referred to as "Jaws". The solicitor involved in many litigation cases against Private Eye, including the Goldsmith case, was Peter Carter-Ruck; to this day the magazine refers to the firm of solicitors as "Carter-Fuck".

Robert Maxwell sued the magazine for the suggestion he looked like a criminal, and won a significant sum. Editor Hislop summarised the case: "I've just given a fat cheque to a fat Czech", and later claimed this was the only known example of a joke being told on News at Ten.

Sonia Sutcliffe sued after allegations made in January 1981 that she used her connection to her husband, the "Yorkshire Ripper" Peter Sutcliffe, to make money. She won £600,000 in damages in May 1989, a record at the time, which was reduced to £60,000 on appeal by Private Eye. However, the initial award caused Hislop to quip outside the court: "If that's justice, then I'm a banana." Readers raised a considerable sum in the "Bananaballs Fund", and Private Eye scored a public relations coup by donating the surplus to the families of Peter Sutcliffe's victims. Later, in Sonia Sutcliffe's libel case against the News of the World in 1990, details emerged which demonstrated that she had benefited financially from her husband's crimes, even though Private Eyes facts had been inaccurate.

In 1994, Gordon Anglesea, a retired police inspector, successfully sued the Eye and three other media outlets for libel over published allegations that he had indecently assaulted under-aged boys in Wrexham in the 1980s. In October 2016, he was convicted of historic sex offences. Hislop stated that the magazine would not attempt to recover the £80,000 in damages Anglesea received, stating: "I can’t help thinking of the witnesses who came forward to assist our case at the time, one of whom later committed suicide telling his wife that he never got over not being believed. Private Eye will not be looking to get our money back from the libel damages. Others have paid a far higher price." Anglesea died in December 2016, six weeks into a 12-year prison sentence.

In 1999, former Hackney London Borough Council executive Samuel Yeboah successfully sued the Eye after he was targeted in the Rotten Borough column "at least 13 times." In this column, Yeboah was described as "corrupt", and using "the Race Card" to escape this criticism. The Eye paid damages and offered an apology.

A victory for the magazine came in late 2001, when a libel case brought against it by a Cornish chartered accountant, John Stuart Condliffe, finally came to trial after ten years and the case was dropped after six weeks when the parties reached an out-of-court settlement in which Condliffe agreed to pay £100,000 towards the Eye'''s defence costs. Writing in The Guardian, Jessica Hodgson noted, "The victory against Condliffe – who was represented by top media firm Peter Carter-Ruck and partners – is a big psychological victory for the magazine".

In 2009, Private Eye successfully challenged an injunction brought against it by Michael Napier, the former head of the Law Society, who had sought to claim "confidentiality" for a report that he had been disciplined by the Law Society in relation to a conflict of interest. The ruling had wider significance in that it allowed other rulings by the Law Society to be publicised.

Ownership

The magazine is owned by an eclectic group of people and is published by a limited company, Pressdram Ltd, which was bought as an "off the shelf" company by Peter Cook in November 1961.Private Eye does not publish a list of its editors, writers, designers and staff. In 1981 the book The Private Eye Story stated that the owners were Cook, who owned most of the shares, with smaller shareholders including the actors Dirk Bogarde and Jane Asher, and several of those involved with the founding of the magazine. Most of those on the list have since died, however, and it is unclear what happened to their shareholdings. Those concerned are reputedly contractually only able to sell their shares at the price they originally paid for them.

Shareholders , including shareholders who have inherited shares, are:
 Jane Asher
 Elizabeth Cook
 executor of the estate of Lord Faringdon
 Ian Hislop (also a director)
 Private Eye (Productions) Ltd
 Anthony Rushton (also a director)
 executor of the estate of Sarah Seymour
 The Private Eye Trust
 Thomas Peter Usborne
 Brock van den Bogaerde (a nephew of Bogarde)
 Sheila Molnar
 Geoff Elwell (also the company secretary).

Within its pages the magazine always refers to its owner as the mythical proprietor "Lord Gnome", a satirical dig at autocratic press barons.

Logo

The magazine's masthead features a cartoon logo of an armoured knight, Gnitty, with a bent sword, parodying the "Crusader" logo of the Daily Express. During the COVID-19 pandemic, Gnitty was pictured wearing a mask.

The logo for the magazine's news page is a naked Mr Punch caressing his erect and oversized penis, while riding a donkey and hugging a female admirer. It is a detail from a frieze by "Dickie" Doyle that once formed the masthead of Punch magazine, which the editors of Private Eye had come to loathe for its perceived descent into complacency. The image, hidden away in the detail of the frieze, had appeared on the cover of Punch for nearly a century and was noticed by Malcolm Muggeridge during a guest-editing spot on Private Eye. The "Rabelaisian gnome", as the character was called, was enlarged by Gerald Scarfe, and put on the front cover of issue 69 in 1964 at full size. He was then formally adopted as a mascot on the inside pages, as a symbol of the old, radical incarnation of Punch magazine that the Eye admired.

The masthead text was designed by Matthew Carter, who would later design the popular web fonts Verdana and Georgia, and the Windows 95 interface font Tahoma. He wrote that, "Nick Luard [then co-owner] wanted to change Private Eye into a glossy magazine and asked me to design it. I realised that this was a hopeless idea once I had met Christopher Booker, Richard Ingrams and Willie Rushton."

See also
 The Spectator Humour magazines
 List of satirical magazines
 List of satirical news websites

References

Further reading
 
 
 Carpenter, Humphrey. (2003) A great, silly grin: The British satire boom of the 1960s (Da Capo Press, 2003).
 
 
 
 Lockyer, Sharon. (2006) "A two-pronged? Exploring Private Eye's satirical humour and investigative reporting." Journalism Studies'' 7.5 (2006): 765-781.

External links

 
 

 
1961 establishments in the United Kingdom
Biweekly magazines published in the United Kingdom
Political magazines published in the United Kingdom
Satirical magazines published in the United Kingdom
Criticism of journalism
Magazines established in 1961
Magazines published in London